Robin Hood is a village in West Yorkshire, England, within the City of Leeds metropolitan borough, with Wakefield WF3, and Leeds LS26 postcodes. It is situated on the A61 and A654 between Leeds and Wakefield, close to Rothwell and Lofthouse.

It forms part of the Ardsley and Robin Hood ward of Leeds City Council and the Morley and Outwood parliamentary constituency.

The centre of Robin Hood is believed to be the Halfway House public house, situated at the main junction of the A61 and A654. The public house gained its name from its location being half-way between Leeds and Wakefield, located exactly 4 miles in either direction on the A61. It used to be known as "The Old Halfway House" and a public house or inn has been located on that site for centuries.

History

Robin Hood was originally part of nearby Carlton village, the original inhabitants were chiefly miners and quarrymen and as such it was built on its large mining history. Its mines at their peak, employing several hundred underground workers for the firm J&J Charlesworth, but the last mine closed in the 1960s.  There has been considerable residential and commercial development in recent years, and has now grown to a population of around 3,573 according to the 2011 census.

Name
The name Robin Hood was first applied to a spring or well situated near the old quarries, it is believed the well-trough, had an iron ladle chained to it. The well no longer exists, and is believed to have been covered up with quarry refuse. It is believed that the well still runs underground and feeds the local streams in the area. There was local opinion that the ceremony of well-dressing, and a country dance called Robin Hood might have been performed there.

The folk hero connection
The area has a suspected link with the medieval folk hero Robin Hood, as some of the original legends do mention an "Outwoods" (quite possibly the Outwood of Wakefield nearby) and the original legends also mention a "Stane Lea" (potentially the nearby village of Stanley). Also, most of the original Robin Hood ballads have him operating in and around Barnsdale forest which is close to Wakefield and surrounding areas.

Mining history and Robin Hood Colliery 
Mining has been performed at various locations in Robin Hood, dating all the way back to the late 1600s. The most notable mining operation was Robin Hood Colliery, which was located opposite the Halfway House pub, and on land located between the A61 and Thorpe Lower Lane A654. The mine opened in 1854 and was operated by J&J Charlesworth, who owned many large collieries in the area. Most of them named after his daughters, including the Robin Hood Colliery which was known as "Jane Pit". The pit closed in the 1960s after being nationalised by the National Coal Board in 1946, it stood derelict on the site until the 1980s and used as a ventilation shaft for other main collieries in the area. It is now occupied by a large housing estate built in the 1990s.

Robin Hood Quarries and Brickworks 
Robin Hood was also home to some large stone quarries and an associated brickworks. The main quarry site was located to the left of Thorpe Lower Lane where it meets Middleton Lane, and it was known as "Robin Hood Quarries". This operated from the late 1800s and closed in the 1950s. Associated with the quarry was Armitage Brickworks, their offices and stone yard was located at the back of the Robin Hood Colliery and extended up Thorpe Lower Lane towards the quarries. Most of this old site is now occupied by the M1 Motorway built in the 1960s. Their major Brickworks operation site was located next to the quarries and further along Middleton Lane where it meets Thorpe Lane.

Robin Hood station and railways 
Robin Hood had its own passenger station, located between Leadwell Lane A654 and Matty Lane (now known as Hopefield Walk). It opened in 1904 and only lasted for 6 months, it continued to be used for excursions and coal traffic. Finally closed and further demolished in the 1960s. The station was part of a large network of railway lines that operated in the Robin Hood, Lofthouse and Rothwell areas known as the East and West Yorkshire Union Railway. The line was built mainly for colliery traffic and linked all the major collieries in the area, starting at Lofthouse and joining the Midland Main Line just past Stourton in Leeds. A large embankment carried the railway from the A61 near the Gardeners Arms Pub and through to Leadwell Lane A654 where a bridge crossed over and into the station, the embankment still stands today and is now part of the Rothwell Greenway. One half of the old Leadwell Lane bridge abutment still stands today at the end of the embankment.

There were numerous branches off this railway located all over the Robin Hood area, including a road crossing on the A61 at what is known as Robin Hood Bridge (where West Beck crosses underneath the road). There was also a further road crossing on Thorpe Lower Lane just before the present M1 underpass, and a large railway junction beyond Robin Hood Station towards Rothwell. It also had branches from Thorpe Lower Lane and up to Castle Pit located off Middleton Lane and the Armitage Brickworks and Robin Hood Quarries.

Not much remains of this line today, apart from a few rails buried just under the surface of Milner Lane and overgrown embankments and cuttings along the route to Rothwell.

Telegraph Repeater Station and RAF Bunker 
There was a large GPO Telegraph Repeater Station located on the corner of Sharpe Lane where it meets the A61 Wakefield Road. It is believed that this was used to boost the strength of electric telephone signals. It also had an associated underground bunker and shelter known as "RAF Rothwell" located just behind the GPO building. It was a large concrete building with blast proof doors and was believed to be associated with RAF Menwith Hill. The GPO Repeater building was demolished around 2007, the concrete bunker still stands today and is now located on a private residence.

Football club
Robin Hood Athletic Football Club were crowned champions of the West Yorkshire Football League Division One in 2013–14 and have since played in its Premier Division.

The team play from the Coach Ground located just behind the Coach and Horses pub on the A61.

Notable former residents
Karl Davey
Mark Davey
Ernie Field
Sidney Parkinson

References

External links

The ancient parish of Rothwell at GENUKI: Robin Hood was in this parish
Robin Hood Athletic Football Club:  

Places in Leeds
Rothwell, West Yorkshire